NATO Maritime Interdiction Operational Training Centre (NMIOTC) is a training facility for NATO, at Crete Naval Base, in Souda Bay, Crete, Greece.

Located at the Northern Sector of the base (Marathi), it enables the NATO forces to better execute surface, sub-surface, aerial surveillance, and special operations activities that are necessary for the support of Maritime Interdiction Operations (MIO).

History 
NATO's Defence Ministers granted permission for NMIOTC's establishment on June 12, 2003, and the first personnel were assigned to its offices in November 2005.

Training 
NMIOTC's role is to offer training for NATO and NATO Partner nations in the following areas:

 Command Team MIO Issues
 Boarding Team Theoretical and Practical Issues
 Final training Tactical Exercise (FTX)
 Maritime Operational Terminology-MOTC
 Weapons of Mass Destruction (WMD) in MIO
 MIO in support of Counter Piracy
 C-IEDS Considerations in Maritime Force Protection
 Legal Issues in MIO
 MIO in support of International Efforts to Counter Human Trafficking Activities at Sea
 Autonomous Vessel Protection Detachment (VPD) Training
 C-IED Considerations in MIO
 MIO in Support of Migration Related Operations-Command Team and Practical Issues
 Maritime-Improvised Explosive Devise Disposal (M-IEDD)
 Maritime Aspects of Joint Operations
 Train the Trainers Technical Instructor Course
 Maritime Biometrics Collection and Tactical Forensic Site Exploitation
 Cyber Security Awareness in Maritime Environment

Gallery

External links
 NATO Maritime Interidiction Operational Training Centre - official website

References 

NATO installations in Greece
Buildings and structures in Chania (regional unit)
Souda Bay